Dušan Tesařík (born 21 March 1976) is a Czech former professional football player. He made 256 appearances in the Czech First League, scoring 18 goals. He played one match for the under 18 team of the Czech Republic.

Tesařík had a long career at Teplice, where he played his last game at Olomouc on 10 May 2006. He later had short spells at Příbram and Ostrava in 2007. Injuries forced Teplice to recall Tesařík to their matchday squad for the match against Olomouc in November 2009, however he remained on the bench as an unused substitute.

References

External links
 

Czech footballers
1976 births
Living people
Czech First League players
FC Fastav Zlín
FK Teplice players
1. FK Příbram players
FC Baník Ostrava players
Association football midfielders
People from Uherské Hradiště
Czech Republic youth international footballers
Sportspeople from the Zlín Region
FK Ústí nad Labem managers
Bohemian Football League managers